Sunny South may refer to:

Sunny South, Alabama
Sunny South (clipper), an American sailing ship

See also
The Sunny South (disambiguation)